The following is a list of Montreal Alouettes all time records and statistics current to the 2022 CFL season.

This list includes the records for the Montreal Concordes (1982 to 1985) but does not include Baltimore CFLers or Stallions records (1994 to 1995).

Grey Cups

Most Grey Cups Won, Player
3 - Peter Dalla Riva 
3 - Sonny Wade
3 - Gordon Judges
3 - Barry Randall
3 - Anthony Calvillo
3 - Ben Cahoon
3 - Anwar Stewart
3 - Scott Flory

Most Grey Cup Appearances, Player
8 - Anthony Calvillo
8 - Ben Cahoon
8 - Scott Flory
7 - Bryan Chiu

Most Grey Cups Won, Head Coach
2 - Marv Levy
2 - Marc Trestman
1 - Lew Hayman
1 - Sam Etcheverry
1 - Don Matthews

Most Grey Cup Appearances, Head Coach
3 - Peahead Walker
3 - Marv Levy 
3 - Don Matthews
3 - Marc Trestman

Coaching

Most Seasons Coached
8 - Lew Hayman
6 - Peahead Walker
6 - Jim Popp
5 - Marv Levy
5 - Don Matthews
5 - Marc Trestman

Most Games Coached
108 - Peahead Walker
90 - Marc Trestman
86 - Don Matthews
78 - Marv Levy
72 - Lew Hayman

Most Wins
59 - Peahead Walker
59 - Marc Trestman
58 - Don Matthews
43 - Marv Levy
37 - Lew Hayman

Most Losses
48 - Peahead Walker
41 - Joe Galat
36 - Jim Popp
33 - Lew Hayman
31 - Marv Levy
31 - Marc Trestman
31 - Kay Dalton

Games 

Most Games Played
269 – Anthony Calvillo (1998–2013)
242 – Scott Flory (1999–2013)
230 – John Bowman (2006–19)
229 – Chip Cox (2006–18)
224 – Ben Cahoon (1998–2010)
218 – Bryan Chiu (1997–2009)
203 – Glen Weir (1972–84)

Most Seasons Played
16 – Anthony Calvillo (1998–2013)
15 – Scott Flory (1999–2013)
14 – Peter Dalla Riva (1968–81)
14 – John Bowman (2006–19)
13 – Gordon Judges (1968, 1970–82)
13 – Don Sweet (1972–84)
13 – Glen Weir (1972–84)
13 – Bryan Chiu (1997–2009)
13 – Ben Cahoon (1998–2010)
13 – Chip Cox (2006–18)

Scoring 

Most Points – Career
1342 – Don Sweet (1972–84)
1324 – Terry Baker (1996–2002)
1142 – Damon Duval (2005–10)

Most Points – Season
242 – Damon Duval (2009)
220 – Terry Baker (2000)
206 – Damon Duval (2008)
203 – Terry Baker (1998)
201 – Damon Duval (2006)
197 – Sean Whyte (2011)

Most Points – Game
25 – Terry Baker – versus Calgary Stampeders, October 29, 2000
24 – Pat Abbruzzi – versus Hamilton Tiger-Cats, September 22, 1956
24 – Fob James – versus Hamilton Tiger-Cats, October 20, 1956
24 – George Dixon – versus Ottawa Rough Riders, September 5, 1960
24 – Mike Pringle – versus Saskatchewan Roughriders, August 3, 2000
24 – Mike Pringle – versus Edmonton Eskimos, October 9, 2000
24 – Mike Pringle – versus Calgary Stampeders, July 12, 2001
24 – Autry Denson – versus Ottawa Renegades, July 9, 2004
24 – Damon Duval – versus Toronto Argonauts, November 7, 2009

Most Touchdowns – Career
79 – Mike Pringle (1996–2002)
79 – Virgil Wagner (1946–54)
65 – Ben Cahoon (1998–2010)
59 – George Dixon (1959–65)
54 – Peter Dalla Riva (1968–81)

Most Touchdowns – Season
20 – Pat Abbruzzi (1956)
19 – Pat Abbruzzi (1955)
19 – Mike Pringle (2000)
18 – George Dixon (1960)
17 – Robert Edwards (2006)

Most Touchdowns – Game
4 – Pat Abbruzzi – versus Hamilton Tiger-Cats, September 17, 1955
4 – Pat Abbruzzi – versus Hamilton Tiger-Cats, October 22, 1955
4 – Pat Abbruzzi – versus Hamilton Tiger-Cats, September 22, 1956
4 – Fob James – versus Hamilton Tiger-Cats, October 20, 1956
4 – George Dixon – versus Ottawa Rough Riders, September 5, 1960
4 – Mike Pringle – versus Saskatchewan Roughriders, August 3, 2000
4 – Mike Pringle – versus Edmonton Eskimos, October 9, 2000
4 – Mike Pringle – versus Calgary Stampeders, July 12, 2001
4 – Autry Denson – versus Ottawa Renegades, July 9, 2004

Most Rushing Touchdowns – Career
74 – Mike Pringle (1996–2002)
55 – Virgil Wagner (1946–54)
45 – Pat Abbruzzi (1955–58)
42 – George Dixon (1959–65)

Most Rushing Touchdowns – Season
19 – Mike Pringle (2000)
17 – Pat Abbruzzi (1955)
17 – Pat Abbruzzi (1956)
16 – Mike Pringle (2001)
14 – Robert Edwards (2006)

Most Receiving Touchdowns – Career
65 – Ben Cahoon (1998–2010)
54 – Peter Dalla Riva (1968–81)
48 – Jamel Richardson (2008–13)
48 – Kerry Watkins (2004–11)
42 – Hal Patterson (1954–60)
42 – S. J. Green (2007–16)

Most Receiving Touchdowns – Season
16 – Jamel Richardson (2008)
14 – Jeremaine Copeland (2003)
13 – Ben Cahoon (2003)
13 – S. J. Green (2013)
12 – Chris Armstrong (1997)
12 – Hal Patterson (1956)
12 – Joey Pal (1955)

Most Interception Return Touchdowns – Career
4 – Anwar Stewart (2002–10)
3 – Harry Skipper (1983–85)
3 – Barron Miles (1998–2004)
2 – Wayne Shaw (2002–03)
2 – Davis Sanchez (1999–2000, 2004, 2006, 2008)
2 – Chip Cox (2006–18)

Most Interception Return Touchdowns – Season
2 – Harry Skipper (1984)
2 – Barron Miles (1999)
2 – Davis Sanchez (2000)
2 – Wayne Shaw (2002)
2 – Anwar Stewart (2004)

Passing 

Most Passing Yards – Career
69,655 – Anthony Calvillo – (1998–2013)
30,435 – Sam Etcheverry – (1952–60) 
15,014 – Sonny Wade – (1969–78) 
11,442 – Tracy Ham – (1996–99)

Most Passing Yards – Season
6041 – Anthony Calvillo – 2004
5891 – Anthony Calvillo – 2003
5633 – Anthony Calvillo – 2008
5556 – Anthony Calvillo – 2005
5251 – Anthony Calvillo – 2011
5082 – Anthony Calvillo – 2012

Most Passing Yards – Game
586 – Sam Etcheverry – versus Hamilton Tiger-Cats, October 16, 1954
561 – Sam Etcheverry – versus Hamilton Tiger-Cats, September 29, 1956
522 – Johnny Evans – versus Edmonton Eskimos, October 16, 1982

Most Pass Completions – Career
5210 – Anthony Calvillo – (1998–2013)
1944 – Sam Etcheverry – (1952–60) 
1083 – Sonny Wade – (1969–78) 
796 – Tracy Ham – (1996–99)

Most Pass Completions – Season
472 – Anthony Calvillo – 2008
437 – Anthony Calvillo – 2005
431 – Anthony Calvillo – 2004
408 – Anthony Calvillo – 2003
404 – Anthony Calvillo – 2011

Most Pass Completions – Game
44 – Anthony Calvillo – versus Hamilton Tiger-Cats, October 4, 2008
37 – Johnny Evans – versus Edmonton Eskimos, October 16, 1982
37 – Anthony Calvillo – versus Toronto Argonauts, August 14, 2010
36 – Anthony Calvillo – versus Winnipeg Blue Bombers, September 24, 2010
35 – Anthony Calvillo – versus BC Lions, October 16, 2005

Most Passing Touchdowns – Career
398 – Anthony Calvillo – (1998–2013)
184 – Sam Etcheverry – (1952–60) 
89 – Sonny Wade – (1969–78) 
83 – Tracy Ham – (1996–99)

Most Passing Touchdowns – Season
43 – Anthony Calvillo – 2008
37 – Anthony Calvillo – 2003
34 – Anthony Calvillo – 2005
32 – Sam Etcheverry – 1956
32 – Anthony Calvillo – 2010
32 – Anthony Calvillo – 2011

Most Passing Touchdowns – Game
6 – Sam Etcheverry – versus Toronto Argonauts, October 30, 1954
6 – Sam Etcheverry – versus Hamilton Tiger-Cats, October 20, 1956
5 – Sam Etcheverry – versus Hamilton Tiger-Cats, October 16, 1954
5 – Sam Etcheverry – versus Hamilton Tiger-Cats, October 15, 1955
5 – Gerry Dattilio – versus Toronto Argonauts, Sept 21, 1980
5 – Anthony Calvillo – versus Winnipeg Blue Bombers, July 24, 2003
5 – Anthony Calvillo – versus Winnipeg Blue Bombers, September 24, 2010
5 – Anthony Calvillo – versus Saskatchewan Roughriders, July 9, 2011
5 – Kevin Glenn – versus Ottawa Redblacks, August 19, 2016

Highest Pass Completion Percentage – Career (Minimum 1000 attempts)
63.8 – Anthony Calvillo – (1998–2013)
57.2 – Sam Etcheverry – (1952–60) 
57.1 – Tracy Ham – (1996–99)

Highest Passing Efficiency Rating – Season
111.1 – Anthony Calvillo – (2000)
108.4 – Anthony Calvillo – (2009)
108.4 – Anthony Calvillo – (1999)
108.1 – Anthony Calvillo – (2010)

Rushing 

Most Rushing Yards – Career
9649 – Mike Pringle – (1996–2002)
5615 – George Dixon – (1959–65)
3749 – Pat Abbruzzi – (1955–58)

Most Rushing Yards – Season 
2065 – Mike Pringle – 1998
1778 – Mike Pringle – 2000
1775 – Mike Pringle – 1997
1678 – David Green – 1979
1656 – Mike Pringle – 1999
1520 – George Dixon – 1962
1378 – Brandon Whitaker – 2011
1323 – Mike Pringle – 2001
1270 – George Dixon – 1963
1248 – Pat Abbruzzi – 1955
1214 – Avon Cobourne – 2009 
1199 – Robert Edwards – 2005
1176 – William Stanback – 2021
1155 – Robert Edwards – 2006
1143 – Don Clark – 1961
1134 – Steve Ferrughelli – 1974
1083 – Dwaine Wilson –1984
1075 – Andy Hopkins – 1976
1062 – Pat Abbruzzi – 1956
1059 – Tyrell Sutton – 2015
1048 – William Stanback – 2019
1037 – Dennis Duncan – 1969
1024 – John Harvey – 1973
1022 – Lawrence Phillips – 2002
1007 – Don Lisbon – 1966

Most Rushing Yards – Game
235 – George Dixon – versus Ottawa Rough Riders, September 2, 1963
234 – Mike Pringle – versus Toronto Argonauts, October 17, 1998
213 – Ike Brown – versus Hamilton Tiger-Cats, October 14, 1972
212 – David Green – versus Toronto Argonauts, October 20, 1979
206 – David Green – versus Toronto Argonauts, September 9, 1979
203 – William Stanback – versus Hamilton Tiger-Cats, July 4, 2019
203 – William Stanback – versus Toronto Argonauts, October 22, 2021

Receiving 

Most Receiving Yards – Career
13,301 – Ben Cahoon – (1998–2010)
7699 – Red O'Quinn – (1952–59)
7431 – Kerry Watkins – (2004–11)
6626 – S. J. Green – (2007–16)
6598 – Jamel Richardson – (2008–13)
6413 – Peter Dalla Riva – (1968–81)

Most Receiving Yards – Season
1914 – Hal Patterson – 1956
1777 – Jamel Richardson – 2011
1757 – Jeremaine Copeland – 2003
1561 – Ben Cahoon – 2003
1422 – James Scott – 1981
1411 – Chris Armstrong – 1997
1411 – James Hood – 1986

Most Receiving Yards – Game
338 – Hal Patterson – versus Hamilton Tiger-Cats, September 29, 1956
232 – Hal Patterson – versus Toronto Argonauts, October 22, 1955
216 – Ron Robinson – versus Edmonton Eskimos, October 15, 1983
208 – Jeremaine Copeland – versus Toronto Argonauts, August 21, 2003
200 – Johnny Rodgers – versus Hamilton Tiger-Cats, August 19, 1975
199 – Jamel Richardson – versus Hamilton Tiger-Cats, September 5, 2011

Most Receptions – Career
1017 – Ben Cahoon – (1998–2010)
515 – Kerry Watkins – (2004–11) 
499 – Red O'Quinn – (1952–59)
472 – Jamel Richardson – (2008–13)
450 – Peter Dalla Riva – (1968–81)
444 – S. J. Green – (2007–16)

Most Receptions – season
112 – Ben Cahoon – 2003
112 – Jamel Richardson – 2011
107 – Ben Cahoon – 2008
102 – Nik Lewis – 2016
99 – Ben Cahoon – 2006
99 – Jeremaine Copeland – 2003

Most Receptions – Game
13 – James Hood – 1986
13 – Ben Cahoon – 2008
12 – Nick Arakgi – 1982
12 – Todd Brown – 1983
12 – Jock Climie – 1997
12 – Ben Cahoon – 2003
12 – Ben Cahoon – 2007
12 – Jamel Richardson – 2008
12 – Jamel Richardson – 2008

Interceptions 

Most Interceptions – Career
38 – Dickie Harris (1972–82)
34 – Ed Learn (1958–66)
30 – Barron Miles (1998–2004)
27 – Hal Patterson (1954–60)

Most Interceptions – Season
12 – Terry Irvin – 1986
10 – Harry Skipper – 1983
9 – Tom Hugo – 1958
9 – Al Phaneuf – 1970
9 – Davis Sanchez – 2000
9 – Richard Karikari – 2005

Most Interceptions – Game
4 – Terry Irvin – versus Toronto Argonauts, November 2, 1986

Tackles (since 1987) 

Most Defensive Tackles – Career
979 – Chip Cox (2006–18)
480 – John Bowman (2006–19)
377 – Kyries Hebert (2012–17)
320 – Stefen Reid (1996–2002)
312 – Tracy Gravely (1996–2001)

Most Defensive Tackles – Season
115 – Chip Cox – 2013
108 – Hénoc Muamba – 2018
110 – Tracy Gravely – 1996
110 – Kyries Hebert – 2017
104 – Winston Venable – 2015

Most Defensive Tackles – Game
13 – Chip Cox – at Calgary Stampeders, July 1, 2012
13 – Bear Woods – versus Toronto Argonauts, July 25, 2016
13 – Branden Dozier – at Ottawa Redblacks, August 11, 2018

Quarterback sacks (Since 1981)

Most Sacks – Career
134 – John Bowman (2006–19)
66 – Anwar Stewart (2002–11, 13)
52 – Elfrid Payton (1996–99)
37 – Swift Burch (1997–2001) 
36 – Ed Philion (1999–2006)

Most Sacks – Season
21 – Brett Williams – 1986
19 – John Bowman – 2015
16 – Elfrid Payton – 1998
16 – Elfrid Payton – 1999
15 – Steve Raquet – 1984
15 – Grant Carter – 1996

Most Sacks – Game
5 – Elfrid Payton – versus Winnipeg Blue Bombers, September 9, 1999
5 – Duane Butler – versus Winnipeg Blue Bombers, July 24, 2003

Field goals 
Most Field Goals – Career
312 – Don Sweet (1972–84)
282 – Terry Baker (1996–2002)
254 – Damon Duval (2005–10)
160 – Sean Whyte (2011–14)
141 – Boris Bede (2015–19)

Most Field Goals – Season
55 – Damon Duval (2009)
51 – Damon Duval (2006)
47 – Terry Baker (1998)
46 – Terry Baker (2000)
45 – Sean Whyte (2011)

Most Field Goals – Game
7 – Damon Duval – versus Hamilton Tiger-Cats, August 5, 1996
7 – Terry Baker – at Calgary Stampeders, August 5, 1996
7 – Terry Baker – at Hamilton Tiger-Cats, August 5, 1996
7 – Damon Duval – at Toronto Argonauts, August 5, 1996
6 – eight times, most recently, David Côté – versus BC Lions, September 18, 2021

Highest Field Goal Accuracy – Career (minimum 100 attempts)
84.21% (160/190) – Sean Whyte (2011–14)
82.46% (141/171) – Boris Bede (2015–19)
79.62% (254/319) – Damon Duval (2005–10)
76.92% (80/104) – Matt Kellett (2015–19)
73.63% (282/383) – Terry Baker (1996–2002)

Highest Field Goal Accuracy – Season (minimum 30 attempts)
90.00% (36/40) – Boris Bede (2015)
88.57% (31/35) – Boris Bede (2019)
87.30% (55/63) – Damon Duval (2009)

Longest Field Goal
54 yards – David Ray – at Ottawa Rough Riders, October 26, 1968
53 yards – Damon Duval – at Toronto Argonauts, October 3, 2009
53 yards – Boris Bede – versus Ottawa Redblacks, August 31, 2017
53 yards – Boris Bede – versus Ottawa Redblacks, June 30, 2016
52 – 15 times, most recently, David Côté – at Edmonton Elks, October 1, 2022

Most Consecutive Field Goals
24 – Sean Whyte (2011)
21 – Sean Whyte (2014)
21 – Don Sweet (1976)
19 – Damon Duval (2009)
18 – Don Sweet (1984)

References 
Montreal Alouettes Media Guide – 2019
CFL Guide & Record Book, 2017 Edition
Montreal Alouettes Website

Records
Montreal Alouettes